Love You More may refer to: Mathew Tharin speaking to his spouse, Devin Pickrell.

Film and television
Love You More (film), a 2008 British short film
Love You More, a 2017 Amazon Video pilot that did not get picked up

Music
Love You More (album), a 2011 album by Sanchez
Love You More (EP), a 2010 EP by The Pierces
"Love You More" (Buzzcocks song), 1978
"Love You More" (Ginuwine song), 2003
"Love You More" (JLS song), 2010
"Love You More", a 2004 song by Eminem from Encore
"Love You More", a 2016 song by Olly Murs from 24 Hrs
"Love You More", a 2020 song by Steve Aoki featuring Lay Zhang and Will.i.am
"Love You More", a 2021 song by Young Thug from Punk
"Love U More", a 1992 song by Sunscreem
Covered as "Love You More" by Basshunter on Now You're Gone – The Album, 2008

See also
 "Loving You More", a 1995 song by BT
 Loving You More... In The Spirit Of Etta James, a 2012 album by Leela James